Lock Up the Wolves is the fifth studio album by American heavy metal band Dio, released on May 15, 1990. It displayed a complete change of musician line-up over the previous album, Dream Evil, including 18-year-old guitarist Rowan Robertson and Simon Wright on drums who had played with AC/DC from 1983 to 1989 as well as bassist Teddy Cook who was in the band Hotshot that morphed into Danger Danger. 

Ronnie James Dio stated that the reason for the change was that it became apparent that the former band members had "lost interest" when compared to Robertson who was the first member of the new line-up. Robertson states that he was playing with the original band for around ten months while the album was being written, Jimmy Bain and Claude Schnell were replaced "along the way" and Vinny Appice was in the band until two weeks before entering the studio to record the album. Vinny Appice confirms that he was there until the album was written and left because he felt "This is not Dio" with "all these young guys in the band".

The song "Evil on Queen Street" takes its title from a deli in Toronto which had a sandwich with that name—per Dio on Much Music in 1990.
Two videos were released from the album, for the songs "Hey Angel" and "Wild One". 

Guitarist Rowan Robertson stated that two more songs were written and demoed for the album but left off at the decision of their manager Wendy Dio: "Hell Wouldn't Take Her" and "The River Between Us".

The album marked a drop-off in Dio's popularity, charting lower than the previous four studio albums. Los Angeles Times stated in September 1990 that the album "died a quick death on the charts" and "half-empty houses are not uncommon" on the ongoing tour.

Track listing
All lyrics and melodies by Ronnie James Dio, music as stated

Personnel
Dio
Ronnie James Dio – vocals
Rowan Robertson – rhythm, lead and acoustic guitars
Jens Johansson – keyboards
Teddy Cook – bass
Simon Wright – drums, percussion

Production
Executive producer - Ronnie James Dio
Arranged by Dio
Produced by Tony Platt and Ronnie James Dio
Recorded by Tony Platt (at Granny's House in Reno, Nevada); assisted by Don Evans
Mixed by Tony Platt and Nigel Green (at Battery Studios in London)
Originally mastered by George Marino

Charts

References

External links 
"Hey Angel" video clip
"Wild One" video clip
Lock Up the Wolves song lyrics

Dio (band) albums
1990 albums
Reprise Records albums
Albums produced by Tony Platt
Vertigo Records albums